Cork is a surname.

People named Cork include:
 Alan Cork (born 1959), English footballer and coach
 Kenneth Cork (died 1991), English insolvency expert
 Bruce Cork (died 1994), American physicist
 Dominic Cork (born 1971), English cricketer
 Jack Cork (born 1989), English footballer
 James M. Cork (1894–1957), American nuclear physicist
 Richard John Cork (1917–1944), English fighter pilot
 Walter E. Cork (1886–1958), American politician and businessman

See also
 Corke